Enmore was an electoral district of the Legislative Assembly in the Australian state of New South Wales, created in 1913. It included the suburb of Enmore in Sydney's Inner West. With the introduction of proportional representation, it was absorbed into the multi-member electorate of Botany. It was recreated in 1927, but was abolished in 1930 and partly replaced by Petersham.

Members for Enmore

Election results

References

Former electoral districts of New South Wales
1913 establishments in Australia
Constituencies established in 1913
1920 disestablishments in Australia
Constituencies disestablished in 1920
1927 establishments in Australia
Constituencies established in 1927
1930 disestablishments in Australia
Constituencies disestablished in 1930